The 23rd Special Tactics Squadron (23rd STS) is an active ground unit, within the 24th Special Operations Wing (24 SOW) United States Air Force Special Operations Command (AFSOC). It is garrisoned at Hurlburt Field, Florida. The 23rd STS was previously designated the 1723rd Special Tactics Squadron prior to 1992.

Overview
The Squadron is made up of Special Tactics Officers, Combat Controllers, Combat Rescue Officers, Pararescuemen, Special Operations Weather Technicians, Air Liaison Officers, Tactical Air Control Party operators.

Special Tactics Squadrons are organized, trained and equipped specifically for various special operations missions facilitating air operations on the battlefield. They conduct combat search and rescue missions, collect intelligence, as well as call in close air support or airstrikes against enemy combatants and are often partnered with other U.S. special operations forces overseas.

History
Constituted 23rd Fighter Control Squadron (Special) on 10 January 1943. Activated on 6 February 1943. Redesignated 23rd Fighter Control Squadron on 16 Sep 1943. Inactivated on 29 Oct 1945. Disbanded on 8 Oct 1948. Reconstituted, and consolidated on 1 March 1992 with 1723rd Combat Control Squadron. Redesignated 1723rd Special tactics Squadron on 1 April 1990; 23rd Special Tactics Squadron on 31 March 1992.

Staff Sgt. Richard Hunter, a combat controller with the 23rd Special Tactics Squadron, received the Air Force Cross for his actions during a battle in Kunduz Province, Afghanistan on 2 November 2016. Hunter was embedded in a joint US Special Forces/Afghan unit that was engaged in a fierce firefight in a village near Kunduz Province, Afghanistan, 2 November 2016. During the eight-hour firefight, Staff Sgt.Hunter called in 31 danger-close air strikes on enemy forces.

Operations

Members of the unit have participated in Operation Just Cause (1989), Operation Desert Shield and Operation Desert Storm (1990–1991), Operation Provide Comfort (1991), Operation Allied Force, Kosovo in 1999, and have been engaged in combat since October 2001 in Operation Enduring Freedom (Afghanistan) and Operation Iraqi Freedom. Members of the U.S. Air Force's 23rd Special Tactics Squadron took part in Haiti earthquake relief operations by providing air traffic control operations at Haiti's Toussaint Louverture International Airport. In the aftermath of Hurricane Michael in 2018, the 23rd came to clear and establish the runway at Tyndall Air Force Base.

See also
List of United States Air Force special tactics squadrons

References

External links

 23rd Special Tactics Squadron at globalsecurity.org

023
Military units and formations in Florida